Shahidur Rahman Chowdhury  (born 17 November 1947), known by his nickname Shantoo, is a former Bangladeshi football player and manager.

Club career
In 1966, after giving his SSC examination in Rangpur, he moved to Dhaka. His football career started the same year for Azad Sporting Club in the Dhaka League, after impressing Azad coach Ranjit Das. However, before playing domestic football in Dhaka, he played in the inter-district team for Rangpur and the divisional team for Rajshahi, where his team reached the district final against Dhaka. He made a name for himself while playing for the Pakistan's two biggest clubs at the time Dhaka Wanderers and Mohammedan SC, before Bangladesh's independence.

International career

Pakistan national team
In 1967, after making his move to Dhaka Wanderers, Shantoo was one of the only four East Pakistani players who were called up to the Pakistan national football team for the 1967 RCD Cup. The other players being Golam Sarwar Tipu, Pratap Shankar Hazra and Hafizuddin Ahmed. He went onto represent Pakistan during the 1969 RCD Cup in Ankara, Turkey and also during the Friendship Cup held in Iran the same year. In 1970, he also played for East Pakistan team in Nepal.

Bangladesh national team
After the 1971 Liberation War, Shantoo played for the President's XI team during the first football match in the newly independent Bangladesh, on 13 February 1972. He kept a cleansheet as his side defeated Bangladesh XI (unofficial Bangladesh national team) 2–0. On 13 May 1972, Shantoo represented the Dhaka XI team as they defeated the first international football team to visit independent Bangladesh, Mohun Bagan AC by a goal from Kazi Salahuddin.

In 1973, coach Shikh Shaheb Ali named Shantoo in the first Bangladesh national football team squad which travelled to Malaysia fothe 1973 Merdeka Tournament. He made his debut for Bangladesh against Thailand during the country's first official international game. With the encounter ending 2–2, Bangladesh were reported to have lost on penalties. With Shantoo in goal, the defense that day included captain Zakaria Pintoo, Abdul Hakim, Sheikh Ashraf Ali and Nazir Ahmed Chowdhury.

Shantoo remained the first choice goalkeeper for the national team during 1975 Merdeka Tournament in Malaysia, 1976 King's Cup and 1978 Asian Games in Bangkok, the 1980 AFC Asian Cup qualifiers in Dhaka, South Korea's 1979 President's Cup, Kuwait's 1980 AFC Asian Cup, President's Gold Cup in Dhaka in 1981 and lastly during the 1982 Quaid-e-Azam International Cup in Pakistan.

Shantoo was made the national team captain for the 1978 Asian Games. At the time when the Dhaka Derby was one of the most heated football rivalries in South Asia, Bangladesh Football Federation's decision to choose Mohammedan SC's Shantoo over the more expirienced Monwar Hossain Nannu of Abahani Krira Chakra, was criticized by both players and fans. This led to six Abahani players quitting the national team before the tournament.

In the opening match of the 1980 AFC Asian Cup against North Korea, coach Abdur Rahim had to substitute an injured Shantoo for the second choice Wahiduzzaman Pintu. Nevertheless, after Pintu's consecutive blunders Bangladesh lost the opening game 2–3. Shantoo went onto start the next couple of the group-stage games against Syria and Iran, conceding a total of 8 goals during them.

Coaching career

Bangladesh Youth
Shantoo managed the defending champions Bangladesh U23 during the 2004 South Asian Games. After a 0–0 draw with India and a 2–1 win over Afghanistan, going into the last group game the Bangladesh team needed a draw against Pakistan to advance past the group-stage. However, Muhammad Essa late penalty knocked Bangladesh out of the tournament.

Shantoo was put incharge of the Bangladesh U17 team for the 2004 AFC U-17 Championship. Although the team got tharshed by Qatar and Iran during the tournament, the team produced future senior international players such as Mohamed Zahid Hossain and Mithun Chowdhury.

Bangladesh
Shantoo was made the interim coach of the senior team before the 2009 SAFF Championship, after Brazilian coach Dido was sacked less than a month before the tournament got underway, as he refused to select established senior players. Shantoo's team cruised thorugh the group-stage, with 4–1 and 2–1 wins over Bhutan and Sri Lanka. However, in the semi-final Bangladesh suffered an embarrassing defeat to eventual champions India who fielded an U23 side. The game marked the end of Shantoo's coaching career.

Honours
Mohammedan SC
 Dhaka League = 1969, 1976, 1978

Brothers Union
 Bangladesh Federation Cup = 1980*
 Aga Khan Gold Cup = 1981–82*

Awards and accolades
1978 − Sports Writers Association's Footballer of the Year.
2004 − National Sports Award.

Cricket career
Shantoo also played domestic cricket fir Mohammedan SC from 70s to 80s, and regularly played as a left-handed medium pace bowler. In the 1970s, during the Shahid Smriti tournament, he took 3 wickets in a single over against Dhaka Wanderers Club cricket team. During the 1963-64 season, he came to Dhaka to play summer cricket for the Sunrise Club of Rajshahi as an eighth grade student. In the first match against National Sporting, he created a surprise with 7 wickets for 14 runs. In the First Division Cricket League he made his debut playing for Dhaka Wanderers Club in 1967.

See also
 List of association footballers who have been capped for two senior national teams

References

Living people
1947 births
Bangladeshi footballers
Bangladesh international footballers
Pakistani footballers
Pakistan international footballers
Dual internationalists (football)
Mohammedan SC (Dhaka) players
Brothers Union players
People from Rangpur District
Association football goalkeepers
Bangladeshi football managers
Bangladesh national football team managers
Asian Games competitors for Bangladesh
Footballers at the 1978 Asian Games
1980 AFC Asian Cup players
Recipients of the Bangladesh National Sports Award